The 2006–07 Nashville Predators season was the ninth National Hockey League season in Nashville, Tennessee.

The Predators, looking to get past the first round of the Stanley Cup playoffs for the first time in franchise history, bulked up their roster by signing star forward Jason Arnott, whose 76 points in 2005–06 was second on the Dallas Stars.  With returning forwards Paul Kariya and Steve Sullivan, and the acquisition of Arnott and Jean-Pierre Dumont, the Predators were predicted to challenge the Detroit Red Wings for top spot in the Central Division.

Although the Predators were leading the Central when the 55th National Hockey League All-Star Game was played in Dallas, Texas, only one Predator player was named to the Western Conference team, defenseman and team captain Kimmo Timonen, who played in his second All-Star Game. Head Coach Barry Trotz served as an assistant coach for the Western Conference.

The attendance in Nashville had been a topic of much media debate all season long, with the Predators' attendance being in the bottom third of the league despite the team leading its division for most of the season.  There had been much speculation in February about a clause in the Predators lease with the city that could force the city of Nashville to buy $2 million worth of tickets for the Predators in the 2007–08 season if the team failed to reach a paid average attendance of 14,000.  After 21 home games, the Predators were only averaging 12,766 in paid attendance.  Team owner Craig Leipold had also announced that he was looking to sell up to 40% of the team to local interests; however, he found no immediate takers.

In February, the Predators acquired forward Peter Forsberg from the Philadelphia Flyers for Scottie Upshall, Ryan Parent and two draft picks.  The deal paid immediate dividends at the gate: the Predators announced they had sold 3,500 tickets for their games in the first day after the trade was announced.

The Predators finished the season with a franchise-record 110 points, with 51 wins, and earned a fourth place seed in the Western Conference quarter-finals in the 2007 Stanley Cup Playoffs. They then lost to the San Jose Sharks in five games in the Quarter-finals.

On May 23, 2007, Craig Leipold was reported to have reached a tentative agreement to sell the team to Research In Motion Chairman and Co-CEO Jim Balsillie. According to Leipold, the team were likely to play the 2007–08 season in Nashville, but the future of the team after that had not been clear. Balsillie had been rumored to be interested in placing another team in Southern Ontario. The sale was later not approved, and the Predators stayed in their city.

Regular season
The Predators finished the regular season having allowed the fewest shorthanded goals, with two.

Season standings

For complete final standings, see 2006–07 NHL season

Game log

October

November

December

January

February

March

April

Green background indicates win.
Red background indicates regulation loss.
White background indicates overtime/shootout loss.

Playoffs
The Nashville Predators ended the 2006–07 regular season as the Western Conference's fourth seed.

Western Conference Quarter-finals: vs. (5) San Jose Sharks
San Jose wins series 4–1

Player stats

Regular season
Scoring

Goaltending

Playoffs
Scoring

Goaltending

Note: Pos = Position; GP = Games played; G = Goals; A = Assists; Pts = Points; +/- = Olus/minus; PIM = Penalty minutes; PPG = Power-play goals; SHG = Short-handed goals; GWG = Game-winning goals
      MIN = Minutes played; W = Wins; L = Losses; T/OT = Ties/overtime losses; GA = Goals-against; GAA = Goals-against average; SO = Shutouts; SA = Shots against; SV = Shots saved; SV% = Save percentage;

Transactions
The Predators have been involved in the following transactions during the 2006–07 season.

Trades

Free agents acquired

Free agents lost

Claimed on waivers

Placed on waivers

Draft picks
Nashville's picks at the 2006 NHL Entry Draft in Vancouver, British Columbia. The Predators traded their first round pick, thus their first selection was in the 2nd round, 56th overall.

Minor league affiliates
The Milwaukee Admirals are Nashville's top affiliate in the American Hockey League in 2006–07, and the New Mexico Scorpions are the Central Hockey League affiliate.

See also
2006–07 NHL season
2007 Stanley Cup Playoffs

References

Nashville Predators player stats on espn.com
Nashville Predators game log on espn.com
NHL standings on espn.com

Nash
Nash
Nashville Predators seasons